The GMC Hummer EV (also known as Hummer EV and badged as HEV) is a line of battery electric full-size vehicles produced by General Motors under the GMC marque, and its own sub-brand. The Hummer EV line was introduced in October 2020 with the unveiling of the pickup truck (SUT) model. The sport utility vehicle (SUV) model was unveiled in April 2021. As of Q3 2022, 783 units have been delivered to customers.

History

Origins 

The GMC Hummer EV originates from the discontinued Hummer brand (stylized HUMMER), previously owned by General Motors. AM General created the hummer brand. Previously, they manufactured the HUMVEE light military vehicle. On June 1, 2009, the company revealed that the Hummer brand would be discontinued as a part of the General Motors bankruptcy announcement.

Trims

Edition 1 
Arriving to the production line in 2022, Edition 1 is the sole model available for the first year and is considered to be a limited edition that was available for pre-order by the end of the launch event on October 20, 2020. All Edition 1 units are white with a black roof and feature bronze-colored wheels. The interior is a two-tone black-and-gray with bronze accents and Edition 1 badges. The Edition 1 will also feature Easter eggs themed after the Apollo 11 moon landing.

The Hummer EV Edition 1 sold out in the first 10 minutes of opening the pre-orders. Initial sales of the Edition 1 were delayed, but were later available in 2022. 

One of the exclusive features introduced with the Hummer EV, coming standard in Edition 1, is the new "Crab Walk", which allows the Hummer EV to travel diagonally by using four-wheel steering. Edition 1 also includes UltraVision underbody cameras for easier off-road maneuverability and visibility, Watts to Freedom system, adaptive air suspension, steel underbody armor, Extract Mode (lifts the suspension six inches for more clearance), Super Cruise (GM's driver assistance system that allows for automatic lane change and hands-free driving on compatible highways that have been mapped by GM), a digital key, removable roof panels, and GMC's MultiPro Tailgate.

In Extract Mode, approach, departure, and breakover angles (the greatest slope angle the vehicle can begin climbing, drive off of, and crest a hill, respectively) are 49.7, 38.4 and 32.2 degrees respectively. GMC estimates wall-climbing ability at 18 inches and suspension travel at 13 inches.

EV2x 
Includes all the features of EV2; however, it will also come standard with 4-wheel steer, Crab Walk, adaptive air suspension with adaptive ride control,  and optional Extract mode. This trim will output an estimated 625hp using a dual motor system, will have an estimated 300+ miles of range, and is expected to be available in Spring of 2023.

EV2 
This is the base Hummer EV trim which will include super cruise, HD surround view, digital key, infinity roof, a multi pro tailgate, and rear drop glass among other standard features. The EV2 will output an estimated  using a dual motor system, with an estimates 250+ miles of range. It is expected to be available by Spring 2024.

Production 
The Hummer EV is produced at GM's Detroit/Hamtramck Assembly plant in Michigan. Production of the Hummer EV SUT commenced on November 17, 2021, while the Hummer EV SUV started production on January 30, 2023. GM recently invested $2.2 billion in the plant for the production of these electric vehicles.

Marketing 
On January 30, 2020, GM released three Quiet Revolution theme teasers of the Hummer EV. These teaser releases were followed up with the first marketing launch with Super Bowl LIV ads on February 2, 2020, with LeBron James as the spokesperson.

The reveal, which was scheduled for May 20, 2020, release, was postponed due to the coronavirus pandemic. It was revealed on October 20, 2020, instead, with reservations opening the same day.

Additionally, the October 20 reveal event was viewable not only on the GMC website, but also via livestream on YouTube, and through a number of short film-styled advertisements run during Game 1 of the 2020 World Series and the premiere of Season 19 of NBC's The Voice.

In January 2021, GMC announced a multiyear sponsorship deal with Chip Ganassi Racing (CGR) which sees CGR rebranded as GMC Hummer EV Chip Ganassi Racing in the FIA-sanctioned international electric off-road racing series Extreme E and the team's Spark ODYSSEY 21 body styled as the Hummer EV.

The Hummer EV is featured in Call of Duty: Warzone 2.0 as one of the drivable vehicles in the game.

See also 
 Electric truck

References

External links 

 

Electric concept cars
Electric trucks
Hummer
GMC vehicles
Cars introduced in 2020